James Cairney (born 13 July 1931) is a Scottish former professional footballer who played as a half-back in the Football League for York City, in Scottish junior football for Strathclyde and Shawfield Juniors, in North America for Toronto Roma, New York Ukrainians and Hartford Italia and was on the books of Portsmouth without making a league appearance. 

In 1958, he played in Canada's National Soccer League with the Polish White Eagles and was named to the All-Star team. He would play with league rivals Toronto Sparta for the 1959 season and once more was selected to the All-Star team. For the 1961 NSL season, Toronto Sparta was renamed, Toronto Roma. Cairney would play in the Eastern Canada Professional Soccer League in 1962 when Toronto Roma became a member. He would re-sign with Toronto for the 1963 season.

He is the brother of Scottish actor and writer John Cairney. They were raised in the Parkhead area of Glasgow (where his first club Strathclyde were based); the referee Tiny Wharton was a childhood acquaintance.

References

1931 births
Living people
Footballers from Glasgow
Parkhead
Scottish footballers
Association football midfielders
Strathclyde F.C. players
Shawfield F.C. players
Portsmouth F.C. players
York City F.C. players
Toronto Roma players
English Football League players
Scottish expatriate sportspeople in Canada
Expatriate soccer players in Canada
Scottish expatriate footballers
Canadian National Soccer League players
Eastern Canada Professional Soccer League players